Maksim Valeryevich Panin (born 8 June 1981) is a former Russian professional football player.

Club career
He played 7 seasons in the Russian Football National League for 4 different clubs.

External links
 
 

1981 births
Sportspeople from Oryol
Living people
Russian footballers
Association football midfielders
FC Metallurg Lipetsk players
FC Salyut Belgorod players
FC Oryol players
FC Zvezda Irkutsk players
FC Avangard Kursk players